The Scottish Chess Championship is organised by Chess Scotland, formerly the Scottish Chess Association. It has been running since 1884, and nowadays takes the form of a nine-round tournament played over two weekends and the week in between. Auxiliary tournaments, such as grading-limited sections and a senior championship take place over the first seven days and there is a Weekend Congress on the second weekend.

Originally, the championship was by invitation only and could only be won by players who would be eligible to compete internationally for Scotland, but sometimes a titled player of another nationality was invited to compete in order to make title norms more likely.

In 2008 the Championship was replaced by an international open.  The Scottish Champion being determined by the highest finishing Scottish player.   The 2009 tournament being held in Edinburgh attracted nine Grandmasters.  The 2010 event took place in Hamilton with the 2011 event back in Edinburgh.  The 2014 Championships was incorporated into the Commonwealth Chess Championships which was held in Glasgow. In 2015 the Event was held in Edinburgh and the 2016 event will be back In Glasgow

The current Tournament Arbiters are IA Alex McFarlane and IA Andy Howie.

Notable Winners

Recent notable winners include Ketevan Arakhamia-Grant in 2003 – the first woman player to win the Scottish Championship, and Jonathan Rowson, who became the first Scottish player to clinch the Grandmaster title on home soil in 1999, and did the Scottish / British double in 2004.  In 2013 Roddy McKay won the title some 39 years after first winning his first title in 1974.  In 2018 Murad Abdulla became the youngest Double winner of the title.

Winners

1884 - John Crum
1885 - Daniel Yarnton Mills
1886 - Georges Emile Barbier
1887 - Daniel Yarnton Mills
1888 - George Henry Mackenzie
1889 - James Marshall
1890 - William Neish Walker
1891 - John D. Chambers
1892 - Daniel Yarnton Mills
1893 - William Neish Walker
1894 - Sheriff Walter Cook Spens
1895 - Daniel Yarnton Mills
1896 - Daniel Yarnton Mills
1897 - Daniel Yarnton Mills
1898 - George Brunton Fraser
1899 - Daniel Yarnton Mills
1900 - Daniel Yarnton Mills
1901 - Dr. Ronald Cadell Macdonald
1902 - E Macdonald
1903 - James Borthwick
1904 - Dr. Ronald Cadell Macdonald
1905 - Dr. Ronald Cadell Macdonald
1906 - Dr. Ronald Cadell Macdonald
1907 - William Gibson
1908 - Arthur John Mackenzie
1909 - Arthur John Mackenzie
1910 - George W Richmond
1911 - JA McKee
1912 - William Gibson
1913 - Arthur John Mackenzie
1914 - William Gibson
1915 - C Wardhaugh
1916 to 1919 - No Championship Held
1920 - P Wenman
1921 - William Gibson
1922 - William Gibson
1923 - William Gibson
1924 - C Heath
1925 - George Page
1926 - JA McKee
1927 - Dr. Ronald Cadell Macdonald
1928 - Dr. Ronald Cadell Macdonald
1929 - William Gibson
1930 - William Gibson
1931 - William Gibson
1932 - William Fairhurst
1933 - William Fairhurst
1934 - William Fairhurst
1935 - James Macrae Aitken
1936 - William Fairhurst
1937 - William Fairhurst
1938 - William Fairhurst
1939 - Max Pavey
1940 to 1945 - No Championship Held
1946 - William Fairhurst
1947 - William Fairhurst
1948 - William Fairhurst
1949 - William Fairhurst
1950 - PB Anderson
1951 - Alexander Aird Thomson
1952 - James Macrae Aitken
1953 - James Macrae Aitken
1954 - PB Anderson
1955 - James Macrae Aitken
1956 - James Macrae Aitken
1957 - James Macrae Aitken
1958 - James Macrae Aitken
1959 - Peter Coast
1960 - James Macrae Aitken
1961 - James Macrae Aitken
1962 - William Fairhurst
1963 - Michael Fallone
1964 - Alexander Munro Davie
1965 - James Macrae Aitken, Peter Michael Jamieson
1966 - Alexander Munro Davie
1967 - Gerald Bonner
1968 - David Levy
1969 - Alexander Munro Davie
1970 - Gerald Bonner
1971 - E Holt, RM McKay
1972 - Gerald Bonner
1973 - Peter Michael Jamieson
1974 - RM McKay
1975 - DNL Levy, S Swanson
1976 - RM McKay
1977 - CW Pritchett
1978 - PA Motwani
1979 - RM McKay
1980 - Danny Kopec
1981 - G Morrison
1982 - RM McKay
1983 - CA McNab
1984 - CSM Thomson
1985 - ML Condie, RM McKay
1986 - Paul Motwani
1987 - Paul Motwani
1988 - RM McKay
1989 - ML Condie
1990 - SR Mannion
1991 - Colin McNab
1992 - Paul Motwani
1993 - Colin McNab, Paul Motwani
1994 - Jonathan Parker
1995 - SR Mannion, Colin McNab, John K Shaw
1996 - DM Bryson
1997 - DM Bryson
1998 - John K Shaw
1999 - Jonathan Rowson
2000 - AJ Norris, John K Shaw
2001 - Jonathan Rowson
2002 - Paul Motwani
2003 - Paul Motwani, Ketevan Arakhamia-Grant
2004 - Jonathan Rowson
2005 - Craig Pritchett
2006 - Jonathan Grant
2007 - Andrew Muir
2008 - Alan Tate
2009 - Iain Gourlay (Scottish Champion 6.5), GM S. Arun Prasad (Open Winner 7.5)
2010 - Andrew Greet
2011 - Ketevan Arakhamia-Grant
2012 - Jacob Aagaard
2013 - RM McKay
2014 - Alan Tate (chess player) 
2015 - Neil Berry (Scottish Champion 7), GM Korneev, Oleg (Open Winner 7.5) 
2016 - Ketevan Arakhamia-Grant (Scottish Champion 6), Matthew J Turner (Open Winner 7.5)
2017 - Murad Abdulla (Scottish Champion 6.5), Andrei Maksimenko (Open Winner 7.5)
2018 - Murad Abdulla (Scottish Champion & Open Winner 8)
2019 - Colin McNab (Scottish Champion 6.5), Matthew J Turner (Scottish Champion 7), Ritvars Reimanis (Open Winner 7)

See also
British Chess Championship

References

External links
List of Scottish champions www.ChessScotland.com

Chess national championships
Championship
Chess
1884 in chess
1884 establishments in Scotland
Recurring events established in 1884
Chess